The Prey of the Dragon is a 1921 British silent adventure film directed by F. Martin Thornton and starring Harvey Braban, Gladys Jennings and Hal Martin. It was based on a short story by Ethel M. Dell.

Cast
 Harvey Braban as Robin Wentworth  
 Gladys Jennings as Sybil Dehan  
 Hal Martin as Jim Curtis  
 Victor McLaglen as Brett 'Dragon' Mercer

References

Bibliography
 Goble, Alan. The Complete Index to Literary Sources in Film. Walter de Gruyter, 1999.

External links

1921 films
1921 adventure films
British adventure films
British silent feature films
1920s English-language films
Films directed by Floyd Martin Thornton
Films set in Australia
Films based on works by Ethel M. Dell
Films based on short fiction
British black-and-white films
Stoll Pictures films
1920s British films
Silent adventure films